This is a list of central government agencies in Indonesia.

State institutions 
According to the current Constitution, state institutions of Indonesia are as follow:

Central government institutions

Ministries 

The current Cabinet, formed on 23 October 2019, comprises the following 34 ministries:

Coordinating Ministries 
Coordinating ministries are tasked mainly to coordinate the various government ministries and other government institutions.
Coordinating Ministry for Economic Affairs
Coordinating Ministry for Human Development and Cultural Affairs
Coordinating Ministry for Maritime and Investments Affairs
Coordinating Ministry for Political, Legal, and Security Affairs

Ministries 
 Ministry of Agrarian Affairs and Spatial Planning/National Land Agency
Ministry of Agriculture
Ministry of Communication and Information Technology
Ministry of Cooperatives and Small and Medium Enterprises
Ministry of Defense
Ministry of Education, Culture, Research and Technology
Ministry of Energy and Mineral Resources
Ministry of Environment and Forestry
Ministry of Finance
Ministry of Foreign Affairs
Ministry of Health
Ministry of Home Affairs
Ministry of Industry
Ministry of Investment/Investment Coordinating Board
Ministry of Law and Human Rights
Ministry of Manpower
Ministry of Marine Affairs and Fisheries
Ministry of National Development Planning/National Development Planning Agency
 Ministry of Public Works and Housing
Ministry of Religious Affairs
Ministry of Social Affairs
Ministry of State Apparatus Utilization and Bureaucratic Reform
Ministry of State-Owned Enterprises
Ministry of State Secretariat
Ministry of Tourism and Creative Economy/Tourism and Creative Economy Agency
Ministry of Trade
Ministry of Transportation
Ministry of Villages, Development of Disadvantaged Regions and Transmigration
Ministry of Women Empowerment and Child Protection
Ministry of Youth and Sports Affairs

Non-ministerial government institutions 
The following outlines non-ministerial government institutions:

Law and security 
 Maritime Security Agency
 National Armed Forces
 National Counter Terrorism Agency
 National Cyber and Crypto Agency
 National Food Agency
 National Disaster Management Authority
 National Narcotics Board
 National Police
 National Resilience Institute
 National Search and Rescue Agency
 Public Prosecution Service
 State Intelligence Agency

Finance 
 Bank Indonesia
 Government Goods and Services Procurement Policy Institute
 Finance and Development Supervisory Agency

Population 

 Central Agency on Statistics
 National Agency for Protection of Indonesian Migrant Workers
 National Population and Family Planning Board

Science and culture 
 Geospatial Information Agency
 Meteorology, Climatology, and Geophysical Agency
 National Agency of Drug and Food Control
 National Archives of Indonesia
 National Library of Indonesia
 National Research and Innovation Agency
 National Standardization Agency
 Nuclear Energy Regulatory Agency

Bureaucracy 
 Cabinet Secretariat
 National Administration Institute
 National Civil Service Agency

Public broadcasting 
 Radio of the Republic of Indonesia
 Television of the Republic of Indonesia

Non-structural government institutions 
The following lists unstructured institutions:

 Acceleration of Housing Enforcement (BP3)
 Acceleration of Infrastructure Provision Policy Committee (KPPIP)
 Anti Dumping Committee (KADI)
 Attorney Commission (Komjak) 
 Broadcasting Commission (KPI) 
 Business Competition Supervisory Commission (KPPU)
 Central Information Commission (KIP) 
 Child Protection Commission (KPAI)
 Civil Service Advisory Agency (BAPEK)
 Commission for Assessment of Analysis of Environmental Impacts (KPA) 
 Commission on Biological Safety of Genetically Engineered Products (KKH PRG)
 Company Privatization Committee
 Cooperative Council
Corruption Eradication Commission (KPK)
 Council of Engineers (DII) 
 Council of Health Workers (KTKI) 
 Counterfeited Rupiah Eradication Coordinating Board (Botasupal) 
 Defense Industry Policy Committee (KKIP) 
 Executive Office of the President (KSP) 
 Film Agency (BPI) 
 Film Censorship Institution (LSF) 
 Financing Policy Committee for Micro, Small and Medium Enterprises
Financial Services Authority (OJK)
 Financial Transaction Reports and Analysis Centre (PPATK)
General Elections Commission (KPU)
 General Elections Organiser Ethics Council (DKPP)
General Elections Supervisory Agency (Bawaslu)
 Government Accounting Standards Committee (KSAP)
 Hajj Financial Management Agency (BPKH)
 Health Workers Disciplinary Board (MDTK) 
 Hospital Oversight Agency (BPRS) 
 Indonesian Academy of Sciences (AIPI) 
 Indonesian Olympic Committee (KOI)
 Institute for the Prevention and Eradication of Forest Damage (LP3H) 
 Istiqlal Mosque Management Executive Board (BPMI)
 Lake Toba Authority Agency (BPODT) 
 Medical Council (KKI) 
 National Accreditation Committee (KAN)
 National Amil Zakat Agency (BAZNAS)
 National Aviation Security Committee
 National Border Management Agency (BNPP) 
 National Commission on Violence against Women (Komnas Perempuan) 
 National Commission on Human Rights (Komnas HAM)
 National Committee on Sharia Economics and Finance (KNEKS)
 National Consumer Protection Agency (BPKN) 
 National Council for Special Economic Zones
 National Defense Council (Wantannas)
 National Disability Commission (KND)
 National Energy Council (DEN) 
 National Film Advisory Agency (BP2N)
 National Health Advisory Agency 
 National Industry Committee (KINAS) 
 National Information and Communication Technology Council (Wantiknas) 
 National Police Commission (Kompolnas) 
 National Productivity Institute (LPN) 
 National Professional Certification Board (BNSP) 
 National Social Security Board (DJSN)
 National Sports Committee of Indonesia (KONI) 
 National Team for the Acceleration of Poverty Reduction (TNP2K) 
 National Transportation Safety Committee (KNKT)
 National Wages Council (Depenas) 
 National Water Resources Council (DSDAN) 
 Nuclear Energy Advisory Council (MPTN) 
 Nusantara Capital City Authority (Otorita IKN) 
 Oil and Gas Downstream Regulatory Agency (BPH Migas) 
 Ombudsman of the Republic of Indonesia (ORI) 
 Pancasila Ideology Development Agency (BPIP)
 Patent Appeal Commission
 Peace Maintenance Mission Coordination Team (TKMPP)
 Peat and Mangrove Restoration Agency (BRGM) 
 Presidential Advisory Council (Wantimpres)
 Press Council
 Public Accountants Professional Committee (KPAP) 
 Public Housing Savings Committee
 Public Housing Savings Management Agency (BP Tapera) 
 Regional Autonomy Advisory Council (DPOD) 
 Regional Border Management Agency (BPPD) 
 Social Security Administrator (BPJS)
 Special Task Force for Upstream Oil and Gas Business Activities (SKK Migas)
 State Civil Service Commission (KASN)
 State Civil Service Advisory Board (BP ASN) 
 Titles, Decorations and Honours Council
 Tourism Promotion Board (BPPI)
 Trade Security Committee (KPPI) 
 Trademark Appeal Commission
 Tripartite Cooperation Institute (LKS Tripartit) 
 Waqf Agency (BWI)
 Witness and Victim Protection Agency (LPSK)

Ministry tiers

Tier 1 Ministries 
Tier 1 Ministries are ministries whose nomenclature, roles and responsibilities are clearly mentioned and unchangeable in the Constitution. Each ministry under this group comprises a Secretariat General, an Inspectorate General, not more than five Experts and a number of Directorates General. Each Minister under this group of ministries is assisted by not more than five Special Officers at the same time.

 Ministry of Defense
 Ministry of Foreign Affairs
 Ministry of Home Affairs

Tier 2 Ministries 
Tier 2 Ministries are ministries whose nomenclature, roles and responsibilities are mentioned in the Constitution but can be changed through establishment of a new Cabinet or reshuffling of the present one. Each ministry under this group comprises a Secretariat General, an Inspectorate General, not more than five Experts and a number of Directorates General. Each Minister under this group of ministries is assisted by not more than five Special Officers at the same time.

 Ministry of Agrarian Affairs and Spatial Planning / National Land Agency
 Ministry of Agriculture
 Ministry of Communication and Information Technology
 Ministry of Education, Culture, Research and Technology
 Ministry of Energy and Mineral Resources
 Ministry of Environment and Forestry
 Ministry of Finance
 Ministry of Health
 Ministry of Industry
 Ministry of Law and Human Rights
 Ministry of Manpower
 Ministry of Marine Affairs and Fisheries
 Ministry of Public Works and Housing
 Ministry of Religious Affairs
 Ministry of Social Affairs
 Ministry of Trade
 Ministry of Transportation
 Ministry of Villages, Development of Disadvantaged Regions and Transmigration

Tier 3 Ministries 
Tier 3 Ministries are ministries whose nomenclature, roles and responsibilities are not mentioned in the Constitution but specifically tasked with sharpening, coordinating and synchronizing government program. Each ministry under this group comprises a Secretariat, an Inspectorate, not more than five Experts and a number of Deputies. Each Minister is assisted by not more than five Special Officers at the same time. Note that Deputy is both a person and a department subordinate to the Minister.

 Ministry of Cooperatives and Small and Medium Enterprises
 Ministry of Investment / Investment Coordinating Board
 Ministry of National Development Planning / National Development Planning Agency
 Ministry of State Apparatus Utilization and Bureaucratic Reform
 Ministry of State-Owned Enterprises
 Ministry of State Secretariat
 Ministry of Tourism and Creative Economy / Tourism and Creative Economy Agency
 Ministry of Women Empowerment and Child Protection
 Ministry of Youth and Sports Affairs

Cabinet-level agencies 
Cabinet-level agencies are state and government institutions formed by the Constitutions and its subordinating laws whose roles and responsibilities are to support all government priorities and strategies set by the President. Each agency is headed by a ministerial-rank official who is not a member of the Cabinet but attends Cabinet meetings regularly. Cabinet-level agencies are:

 Cabinet Secretariat, represented in the cabinet by the Cabinet Secretary
 Public Prosecution Service, represented in the cabinet by the Attorney General
 Executive Office of the President, represented in the cabinet by the Presidential Chief of Staff
 National Armed Forces, represented in the cabinet by the Commander of the National Armed Forces
 National Police, represented in the cabinet by the Chief of the National Police
 National Research and Innovation Agency, represented in the cabinet by the Chairman of the National Research and Innovation Agency
 Nusantara Capital City Authority, represented in the cabinet by the Head of the Nusantara Capital City Authority
 State Intelligence Agency, represented in the cabinet by the Chief of the State Intelligence Agency

References 

Politics of Indonesia
Government of Indonesia